Marmaduke School District  is a school district based in Marmaduke, Arkansas.

The school district provides elementary and secondary education from pre school through grade 12 for approximately 800 students and employs more than 120 faculty and staff on a full time equivalent basis. The district encompasses  of land in Greene County, Arkansas, and supports all or portions of the communities of Marmaduke and Lafe.

Kindergarten through 6th grade is in the Elementary building. While 7th through 12th grade, is in the high school building.

On July 1, 1984, the Lafe School District merged into the Marmaduke district.

See also 
 Greene County Tech School District
 Paragould School District

References

Further reading
 (Download) - Includes maps of predecessor districts

External links
 

Education in Greene County, Arkansas
School districts in Arkansas